Qaleh Now-e Kharaqan (also Romanized as Qal‘eh Now-e Kharaqān, Qal‘eh-ye Now-e Kharaqān, Qal‘eh-ye Now-e Khareqān, and Qal‘eh-ye Now Khareqān; also known as Ghal’eh Now Kharaghan, Qal‘eh Nau, Qal‘eh Now-e Kharagān, and Qal‘eh-ye Now) is a city in Kharqan Rural District, Bastam District, Shahrud County, Semnan Province, Iran. At the 2011 census, its population was 3,927, in 1248 families.

References 

Populated places in Shahrud County